Max C. Black (born July 2, 1936 in Delta, Utah) is a Republican Idaho State Representative representing District 15 in the B seat from 1993 to 2012.

Education 
Black graduated from Delta High School and earned his bachelor's degree in business administration from the University of Utah.

Elections
2010

Black won the May 25, 2010, Republican primary with 2,007 votes (58.3%) against Mark Patterson, with no Democratic primary, and Gardner again as the Libertarian nominee. Black won the November 2, 2010, general election with 8,188 votes (78.7%) against Gardner in their final contest together ––their third head-to-head and their sixth overall.

2008

Unopposed for the May 27, 2008, Republican primary, Black won with 2,118 votes; Greg Funk won the Democratic primary unopposed, and Gardner again qualified as the Libertarian candidate, for their fifth contest together. Black won the three-way November 4, 2008, general election with 8,963 votes (54.3%) against Funk and Gardner.

2006

Unopposed for the May 23, 2006, Republican primary, Black won with 3,247 votes, again with no Democratic candidate and again with Gardner as the Libertarian nominee for their fourth match and second head-to-head contest. Black won the November 7, 2006, general election with 8,622 votes (73.51%) against Gardner.

2004

Black won the May 25, 2004, Republican primary with 1,123 votes (51.61%) against Lynn Luker; no Democratic candidate ran, and Gardner again qualified as the Libertarian candidate, setting up a head-to-head match for their third contest. Black won the November 2, 2004, general election with 11,764 votes (77.1%) against Gardner. Luker would go on to win the District 15 A seat in 2006, serving together until 2012.

2002

Black won the May 28, 2002, Republican primary with 2,386 votes (53.5%) against Jack Friesz; Waddell and Gardner won their primaries, setting up a rematch. Black won the three-party November 5, 2002, general election with 6,353 votes (53.2%) against Waddell and Gardner.

2000

Unopposed for the May 23, 2000, Republican primary, Black won with 4,618 votes, and won the three-party November 7, 2000, general election with 9,984 votes (63.2%) against Kathy Waddell (D) and Libertarian nominee Marvin Gardner.

1998

Unopposed for the May 26, 1998, Republican primary, Black won with 2,937 votes, and was unopposed for the November 3, 1998, general election, winning with 10,542 votes.

1996

Black won the May 28, 1996, Republican primary with 2,092 votes (61%) against Dan Westmark, and won the November 5, 1996, general election with 10,396 votes (67.6%) against Debi Gier (D).

1994

Unopposed for the May 24, 1994, Republican primary, Black won with 4,383 votes, and was unopposed for the November 8, 1994, general election, winning with 11,021 votes.

1992

When Republican Representative Phil Childers left the District 15 B seat open for his successful run for the district's senate seat, Black won the Republican primary against John Hart, and won the November 3, 1992, general election against Democratic nominee Kaye Knight.

References

External links
 

1936 births
Living people
Republican Party members of the Idaho House of Representatives
People from Boise, Idaho
People from Delta, Utah
University of Utah alumni